The Gothic House, also known as the John J. Brown House, is an historic house at 387 Spring Street in Portland, Maine.  Built in 1845, it is one of Maine's finest and earliest known examples of Gothic Revival architecture.  Although it is virtually unaltered, it was moved down Spring Street in 1971 to avoid demolition.  It was listed on the National Register of Historic Places in 1974.

Description and history
The Gothic House is located in Portland's West End neighborhood, on the north side of Spring Street, a short way east of the Western Cemetery.  Spring Street here is part of the Spring Street Historic District, a cluster of well-preserved 19th century residences.  The house is a two-story wood-frame structure, with a hip roof, wooden siding treated to resemble rusticated stone, and a modern concrete foundation.  The main (south-facing) facade is three bays wide, with a central projecting section housing the main entrance.  That section, topped by a steeply-pitched gable, has a two-pointed Gothic arched window on the second level, and the entrance, sheltered by a Gothic-detailed porch on the first.  Windows in the flanking bays are diamond-paned casement windows.  The main gable in front, and smaller gables on the side elevations, are all decorated with bargeboard trim.

The house was designed by Irish immigrant Henry Rowe (1812–1870), a major proponent of the Gothic Revival, and built in 1845; it is believed to be Rowe's first commission in the state, and is described in city promotional materials as the finest example of Gothic Revival architecture in Maine.  The design is based in part on examples published in Andrew Jackson Downing's 1842 Cottage Residences.  The house was originally located approximately a mile to the east of the present location, closer to the city's port area. Faced with demolition in 1971, it was moved further down Spring Street and a Holiday Inn hotel was constructed in the former location.

A bronze and brass Gothic chandelier that once hung in the parlor of the house was on exhibit at the Metropolitan Museum of Art in New York City from April to September 1970.

See also
National Register of Historic Places listings in Portland, Maine

References

Houses completed in 1845
Houses on the National Register of Historic Places in Maine
Houses in Portland, Maine
Carpenter Gothic architecture in Maine
West End (Portland, Maine)
National Register of Historic Places in Portland, Maine
Historic district contributing properties in Maine